The 1988 Virginia Slims of Washington was a women's tennis tournament played on indoor carpet courts at the Patriot Center in Fairfax, Virginia in the United States and was part of the Category 5 tier of the 1988 WTA Tour. It was the 17th edition of the tournament and was held from February 22 through February 28, 1988. First-seeded Martina Navratilova won the singles title.

Finals

Singles

 Martina Navratilova defeated  Pam Shriver 6–0, 6–2
 It was Navratilova's 3rd singles title of the year and the 132nd of her career.

Doubles

 Martina Navratilova /  Pam Shriver defeated  Gabriela Sabatini /  Helena Suková 6–4, 6–4
 It was Navratilova's 6th title of the year and the 270th of her career. It was Shriver's 5th title of the year and the 108th of her career.

References

External links
 ITF tournament edition details
 Tournament draws

1988 WTA Tour
1988
1988 in sports in Virginia
1988 in American tennis